Pierce Middle School may refer to:
 William G. Pierce Middle School, Hillsborough County, Florida
 Pierce Middle School, Grosse Pointe Park, Michigan
 John D. Pierce Middle School, Redford, Michigan
 Pierce Middle School, Waterford, Michigan
 Pierce Middle School, part of the same district as Milton High School.

See also
 Peirce Middle School (disambiguation)